Julián Felipe Muñoz Palomo (El Arenal, Ávila, November 24, 1948) is a Spanish politician, known for his controversial tenure as mayor of Marbella and for being the boyfriend of singer Isabel Pantoja.

Biography
He studied Law and married Maite Zaldívar. In 1991 he became an important member of the Independent Liberal Group (GIL), reaching the second place in the electoral list in 1999. In 2002, following the resignation of Jesús Gil due to his involvement in a corruption case, Muñoz took over the duties of the Mayor of Marbella until he officially obtained the post on May 2, 2002.

In 2003 the GIL, with Muñoz as their leader, obtained an absolute majority in the Marbella town council. On August 13 of that year, Muñoz lost the mayorship after a motion of censure driven by a group of seven defectors from GIL, after which Marisol Yagüe became the new mayor.

Muñoz was arrested in July 2006 in the second phase of Operation Malaya, in the most important case of corruption in Spain up to then. Muñoz was convicted for several cases of bribery, embezzlement and breach of trust. After nearly two years behind bars he was released from prison in 2008 but was arrested again in 2013 for other offenses related to Operation Malaya. Due to poor health stemming from his having Diabetes mellitus type 1 he is in a less restricted degree of incarceration since May, 2016.

References

1948 births
Living people
Spanish politicians convicted of crimes
Spanish prisoners and detainees
Liberal Independent Group politicians
Mayors of places in Andalusia
Municipal councillors in the province of Málaga
Politicians convicted of embezzlement
People convicted of bribery